The Lișcov is a left tributary of the river Horincea in Romania. It flows into the Horincea near Cavadinești.

References

Rivers of Romania
Rivers of Galați County
Rivers of Vaslui County